This is a list of airlines which have an air operator's certificate issued by the Civil Aviation Authority  of the Netherlands Antilles.

See also 
List of airlines

Netherlands Antilles
Airlines
Antilles
Netherlands Antilles